Rufus French (born March 15, 1978) is a former American football tight end who played college football at the University of Mississippi and attended Amory High School in Amory, Mississippi. He was a consensus All-American in 1998. He was also a member of the Seattle Seahawks and Green Bay Packers.

Early years
French played football and baseball at Amory High School. He was drafted by the San Diego Padres in the 30th round of the 1996 MLB June Amateur Draft.

College career
French chose to play football for the Ole Miss Rebels. He was a consensus first-team All-American in 1998. French was a first-team All-SEC selection in 1997 and 1998. He was a finalist for the Conerly Trophy in 1998. French finished his college career with 84 receptions, 814 receiving yards and four receiving touchdowns. He chose to forgo his senior season and enter the 1999 NFL Draft.

Professional career

Seattle Seahawks
French signed with the Seattle Seahawks after going undrafted in the 1999 NFL Draft. He missed the 2000 season while recovering from a knee injury. He was released by the Seahawks on August 5, 2001.

Green Bay Packers
French was signed by the Green Bay Packers on March 26, 2002. He was released by the Packers on July 23, 2002.

References

External links
NFL Draft Scout
Fanbase profile

Living people
1978 births
Players of American football from Mississippi
American football tight ends
African-American players of American football
Ole Miss Rebels football players
All-American college football players
People from Amory, Mississippi
Amory High School alumni
21st-century African-American sportspeople
20th-century African-American sportspeople